Fontaine-lès-Croisilles (literally Fontaine near Croisilles) is a commune in the Pas-de-Calais department in the Hauts-de-France region of France.

Geography

Population

Places of interest
 The church of St.Maurice, rebuilt, as was all the village, after World War I.

See also
Communes of the Pas-de-Calais department

References

Fontainelescroisilles